The Agnes Hoppin Memorial Fellowship was an academic fellowship intended to “lift the restrictions on women in the study of archaeology”. It was established at the American School of Classical Studies in Athens in 1898 by the Hoppin family.

The award was founded in memory of Agnes Clark Hoppin by her brother, Professor Joseph Hoppin. It was awarded from 1898-1904 and was worth $1,000 per year.

List of Fellows 
The recipients were:
 1898–1899 May Louise Nichols, Smith College
 1899–1900 Harriet Ann Boyd, Smith College
 1900–1901 Lida Shaw King, Vassar College
 1901–1902 Agnes Baldwin, Barnard College
 1902–1903 Leila Clement Spaulding, Vassar College
 1903–1904 Edith Hayward Hall, Smith College

References

Fellowships